Anna Füssli (16 September 1749 - 24 February 1772) was a Swiss painter. She specialized in flower and insect paintings.

Life and work

Anna Füssli was born in Zurich on 16 September 1749. Her father was Johann Caspar Füssli. Fussli became a respected painter, specializing in flower and insect paintings. Her skill was described as "excellent" by colleagues.

References

1749 births
1772 deaths
18th-century Swiss painters
Artists from Zürich
Swiss women painters
Anna